André Magnin (born 11 July 1967) is a retired Swiss football striker.

References

1967 births
Living people
Swiss men's footballers
FC Bulle players
Association football forwards
Swiss Super League players
Place of birth missing (living people)